Agnes Scott College is a private women's liberal arts college in Decatur, Georgia. The college enrolls approximately 1,000 undergraduate and graduate students. The college is affiliated with the Presbyterian Church and is considered one of the Seven Sisters of the South. It also offers co-educational graduate programs.

History
The college was founded in 1889 as Decatur Female Seminary by Presbyterian minister Frank Henry Gaines. In 1890, the name was changed to Agnes Scott Institute to honor the mother of the college's primary benefactor, Col. George Washington Scott. The name was changed again to Agnes Scott College in 1906, and remains today a women's college.

Agnes Scott is considered the first higher education institution in the state of Georgia to receive regional accreditation. The ninth and current president since July 2018 is Leocadia I. Zak, who previously worked as director of the U.S. Trade and Development Agency (USTDA).

On July 27, 1994, the campus was listed on the National Register of Historic Places as part of the South Candler Street-Agnes Scott College Historic District. The historic district boundaries are East College Ave., South McDonough St., S. Candler St., East Hill St. and East Davis St. It includes the entire campus, as well as historic homes adjacent to the campus. The campus is also designated by the City of Decatur as a historic district.

The Reverend Frank Henry Gaines served as the first President of Agnes Scott, formally known as Decatur Female Seminary School, for 27 years (1896-1923). During his 27-year presidency, he ensured stability and success for the school, including the transition to the collegiate level, accreditation by the Southern Association of Colleges and Schools, acquisition of 20 acres of land and 21 buildings and an increase in assets from $5,000 to $1.5 million.

Campus
Agnes Scott College is located within walking distance of downtown Decatur. A MARTA subway station, located in downtown Decatur, allows students to travel to Atlanta.

Agnes Scott (Main) Hall, named after Agnes Irvine Scott, is located at the center of "the loop" and is a one among many Agnes Scott buildings that was listed in the National Register of Historic Places. Main was built in 1891, which makes it the oldest building on campus. Main once housed the entire school. This is documented in the history of Agnes Scott by Dr. McNair entitled Lest We Forget published in 1983. 

As technology became more advanced so did Main. Main Hall was the first building on campus and in the neighborhood to have electric lighting. Some say that people would gather outside of Main at night just to admire the light shining within the building.

The college also owns the Avery Glen apartments as well as more than a dozen houses in the surrounding neighborhoods housing faculty, staff, and students. There are also six dedicated undergraduate dormitories located on campus.

The Bradley Observatory at Agnes Scott houses the Beck Telescope, a  Cassegrain reflector, as well as a planetarium with 70-seat capacity and a radio telescope. Recently Agnes Scott College and the Georgia Tech Research Institute have collaborated on a project that added a LIDAR facility to the observatory.

The college's science building contains a three-story rendering of part of the nucleotide sequence from Agnes Scott's mitochondrial DNA. The DNA came from a blood sample of an ASC alumna who is a direct descendant of the college's namesake.

American poet Robert Frost was an annual visitor at Agnes Scott from 1945 to his death in 1963. During his visits, he would read poetry in Presser Hall. A statue of the poet sculpted by George W. Lundeen sits in the alumnae gardens. A collection of Robert Frost's poetry and letters can be viewed at McCain Library.

The campus has been a filming location for many productions. Complaints by students and alumni about disrespectful production crews and about sexist content in nonetheless rental-income-generating projects such as Road Trip: Beer Pong led to a new policy that requires school review of potential projects, responsibility training for crew members and extras, and at least one educational opportunity for students.

Sustainability
Agnes Scott has committed to becoming a carbon-neutral institute by the college's 150th anniversary in 2039 and has taken steps such as partnering with the Clean Air Campaign to reduce its impact on the local environment.

, the college has five solar arrays, four of which are part of Georgia Power's Advanced Solar Initiative. The fifth array is on the rooftop of the Bradley Observatory and is also used for student research. The renovation of Campbell Hall into a mixed use residence hall, learning center, and office space was concluded in 2014 and included installation of a hydro-geothermic HVAC system.

The college hosts a Zipcar.

Academics 
Agnes Scott offers 34 undergraduate majors and 9 graduate and post-baccalaureate programs. The undergraduate core curriculum SUMMIT focuses on leadership development, global learning, and digital literacy. In 2019, Agnes Scott received the Heiskell Award for Scholars as Drivers of Innovation for its SUMMIT curriculum. 

SUMMIT at Agnes Scott is split into six areas of focus:

 The Four-Year experience
 Professional Success at Agnes Scott
 Board of Advisors
 Digital Literacy
 Global Learning
 Leadership Development

Undergraduate students are able to cross-register in other ARCHE member institutions. Its most popular undergraduate majors, based on 2021 graduates, were:
Creative Writing (21)
Psychology (18)
International Relations and Affairs (16)
Biology/Biological Sciences (14)
Public Health (14)
Multi-/Interdisciplinary Studies (12)

Library 
The library at Agnes Scott College was an original Carnegie library built in 1910. The building was demolished in 1986.

A new library was authorized by the board of trustees in 1935 and opened in the fall of 1936. This new library was called the "Carnegie Library" and the original library was turned into a student center. It was renamed in 1951 for James McCain, on the occasion of his retirement as the 2nd President of the college. In 1974-1977 and again in 1999–2000, the library underwent renovations.

McCain Library is a member of the Oberlin Group of Libraries, a consortium of 83 leading liberal arts colleges in the United States. The purpose of the group centers on promoting dialogue and the sharing of ideas to better inform respective library operations and services, including adaptation to evolving challenges.

Student life

Diversity
The Fall 2022 ethnicities of the undergraduate student body were: 0.1% American Indian or Alaskan Native, 5.7% Asian, 31.8% Black or African American, 37.1% White, 14.4% Hispanic/Latino, 2.4% non-resident Alien, 6.0% two or more races, and 2.3% other or unknown. 61.3% of undergraduates that year were from Georgia.

Housing
Given Agnes Scott's emphasis on "mak[ing] lifelong friends, shar[ing] unforgettable experiences, discover[ing] meaningful places and find[ing] belonging in [their] community," a majority of students are encouraged to live on campus. Thus, most students are expected to live in on-campus housing for all four years as an undergraduate at Agnes Scott College. However, the proportion of commuter students has increased (from 15.6 to 18.0 percent between the 2014-2015 and 2019-2020 academic year) due to limited housing caused from an increase in the student population (from 849 to 986 total students) and renovations to the residence halls.

There are six resident halls situated around the Northern edge of the campus: Winship, Walters, Inman, Rebekah, Campbell and Agnes Scott Hall (nicknamed "Main"). The college also owns off-campus apartments one block from campus called Avery Glen. Winship and Walters are traditionally reserved for first-year students.

Campus organizations
There are over 50 student organizations on campus. Sororities are prohibited.

Publications
The college hosts several student publications, including the The Silhouette, the college's yearbook published annually, and The Aurora, Agnes Scott's literary magazine. All students are invited to join the staff.

Athletics
Agnes Scott is a member of the National Collegiate Athletic Association Division III which fields six sports teams including basketball, cross country, soccer, softball, tennis, and volleyball. All teams compete in the Collegiate Conference of the South (CCS). The tennis team is arguably Agnes Scott's most successful team, having won the conference championship and advanced to the NCAA national tournament six times: 2009, 2010, 2011, 2012, 2013 and 2015. The newest team is cross country, which was restarted in 2014 after being cut during the 2008 school year.
 
Agnes Scott uses the tune of the Notre Dame Victory March as their fight song and to rally the students together during the annual Black Cat Spirit Week. The Agnes Scott mascot is a "Scottie", a Scottish Terrier named Victory.

Traditions

Alumnae Pond
Tradition dictates that students who get engaged are thrown into the alumnae pond by their classmates.

Bell Ringers
Seniors at Agnes Scott traditionally ring the bell in Agnes Scott Hall's bell tower upon acceptance to graduate school or a job offer. This tradition dates from the early 1990s after the tower acquired its bell during the administration of President Ruth Schmidt. Students who ring the bell sign their names on the walls of the tower.

Black Cat
The tradition of Black Cat started during the year of 1915 as an attempt to dissuade the excessive hazing of underclassmen, first-years and sophomores, by upperclassmen, juniors and seniors. Originally just a day, "Dr. Mary Sweet, the head of Physical Education, came up with a 'battle of the wits' to challenge both classes, and which ever class won would get the bronze statue of a cat Hazing did not completely end, as shown by the rules which freshmen had to follow for Sophomore week in 1923".

During the late 1980s, Black Cat expanded to a weekend filled with class competition; gradually, it became a weeklong event. Currently, Black Cat occurs every fall and is Agnes Scott's version of homecoming week. The week includes:

"The "rushing of the quad" at midnight of the Monday of Black Cat Week allows each class to cover the quad in decorated objects in their class color to earn points. There is an inter-class trivia competition, a field-day competition and a dance competition. On the Thursday of Black Cat, the students gather for Bonfire. Each class comes up with a song for their class and for their sister class, which are all sung in front of a bonfire. On Friday night, the Junior class performs their original play and the Black Cat dance is held on Saturday night".

During Black Cat week, the first-year class also unveils their elected mascot that traditionally somehow references their class color. If there is dissatisfaction with a class mascot, the class is given the option to revote a different mascot the second semester of their first-year. After their first year, their class mascot becomes permeant and can no longer be changed.

Class Colors
Each incoming class is assigned a class color—red, yellow, blue, or green—and votes on a class mascot that correlates with that color. The colors and mascots are intended to establish class pride, particularly during one week of activities called Black Cat.

Pestle Board
A senior-only social and philanthropic society created to lampoon the campus chapter of the academic honor society Mortar Board. Whereas Mortar Board has strict GPA and extracurricular prerequisites for membership, Pestle Board's only entry requirement is the completion of a humorous initiation process known as "capping" that pairs junior "cappees" with graduating senior "cappers". Capping also involves Pestle Board's largest philanthropic fundraiser of the year.

Class Ring
The class ring is given to students during the spring of their sophomore year in a special ceremony. The ring is very distinctive with a rectangular engraved black onyx stone inscribed ASC and has remained essentially the same since its introduction in the 1920s with choices only in metal (white or yellow gold) and antiquing. Alumnae who wear the ring are recognizable to one another or those familiar with the college's tradition. Students and Alumnae alike dub themselves the "Black Ring Mafia".

Honor Code
The honor code is held in high regard among Agnes Scott students and faculty. At the beginning of every academic year, new students must sign the honor code and recite a pledge promising to uphold the high academic and social standards of the institution.

Students self govern and ask violators of the code to turn themselves in to Honor Court. The trust the Honor Code builds between faculty and students allows for students to take self scheduled, unproctored, exams.

Mascot and School Colors
The school colors of Agnes Scott are purple and white and the school mascot is the Scottie, a Scottish Terrier.

Senior Investiture
Senior Investiture is one of the college's most cherished traditions. During the investiture ceremony in the fall of students' senior year, each student is capped with an academic mortar board as a symbol of her senior status at the college by the Dean.

Writers' Festival

One of the most significant events on Agnes Scott's annual calendar is the Writers' Festival which occurs each spring since 1972. Its purpose is to promote and encourage creative writing skills among college students in Georgia. Undergraduate students throughout Georgia are invited to submit manuscripts (poetry or prose). The manuscripts are screened by qualified judges, and the work of the finalists is ultimately evaluated by a panel of recognized writers who are brought to the campus to participate in the festival either by lectures or by readings from their works. The winners of the best work in each of the various categories receive a cash prize.

Rankings

Agnes Scott was named as one of the Colleges That Change Lives (CTCL).

U.S. News & World Reports 2023 rankings include:
 No. 1 in Most Innovative Schools (National Liberal Arts Colleges)
 No. 1 First-Year Experience (National Liberal Arts Colleges)
 No. 3 in Best Undergraduate Teaching (National Liberal Arts Colleges)
 No. 3 in Study Abroad (National Liberal Arts Colleges)
 No. 3 in Learning Communities (National Liberal Arts Colleges)
 No. 11 in Co-ops/Internships (National Liberal Arts Colleges)
 No. 26 in Best Value Schools (National Liberal Arts Colleges)
 No. 63 among National Liberal Arts Colleges
Princeton Review's 2023 rankings include:
The Best 388 Colleges
No. 1 for Town-Gown Relations are Great (Private Schools) 
No. 3 for Best Schools Making an Impact (Private Schools)
No. 5 for LGBTQ-Friendly (Private Schools)
No. 6 for Best Alumni Network (Private Schools)
No. 11 for Best Student Support and Counseling Services (Private Schools)
No. 18 for Best Classroom Experience (Private Schools)
No. 47 for Top Green Colleges

Media production on campus 
The college's campus has been used in many films and televisions shows:

Films 

 A Man Called Peter (1955)
 The Double McGuffin (1978)
 The Four Seasons (1980)
 The Bear (1983)
 Legend (1985)
 Driving Miss Daisy (1989)
 Decoration Day (1990)
 Fried Green Tomatoes (1991)
 Scream 2 (1997)
 The Adventures of Ociee Nash (2002)
 Bobby Jones: Stroke of Genius (2003)
 Revenge of the Nerds (Remake) (2006)
 Why Did I Get Married? (2007)
 The Blind Side (2009)
 The Greening of Whitney Brown (2009)
 Big Mommas: Like Father, Like Son (2010)
 Single Moms Club (2012)
 Confirmation (2016)
 The Immortal Life of Henrietta Lacks (2017)
 Life of the Party (2018)

Television 

 A Season In Purgatory (1996)
 Tell Me Lies (2022-present)

Notable alumnae
Martha Bailey '97, professor of Economics and Scholar of how access to contraception has shaped women's lives
Tommie Dora Barker, 1909, public librarian and founding dean of Emory Library School
 Margaret Booth (Agnes Scott Institute, d.), educational and cultural mentor for the Montgomery, Alabama area; Inducted into the Alabama Women's Hall of Fame posthumously in 1999
 Mary Brown Bullock '66, president emerita and only alumna to serve as president of the college
Jordan Casteel, '11, award-winning figure painter
 Constance Curry '55, civil rights activist
 Goudyloch E. Dyer '38, Illinois state representative
 Margot Gayle '31x, American historic preservationist and author who helped save the Victorian cast-iron architecture in New York City's SoHo district 
 Ivylyn Girardeau 1922, medical missionary in India and Pakistan
Mary Norton Kratt, '58, writer of Charlotte history and Southern novels.
Kay Krill '77, president and chief executive officer of ANN INC., parent company of Ann Taylor and LOFT
 Anne Harris, '91 14th president of Grinnell College, PhD from the University of Chicago and medieval art historian
 Katherine Harris '79, Florida senator
 Bertha "B" Holt '38 (d.), former North Carolina State Representative and children's rights advocate
 Anna Colquitt Hunter, founder of Historic Savannah Foundation
 Michelle Malone '90x, musician
 Catherine Marshall '36, author of the novel Christy, later made into a TV series and A Man Called Peter
 Joanna Cook Moore, actress and mother of Tatum O'Neal
 Wasfia Nazreen, 2006, Bangladeshi mountaineer, activist, and writer
 Jennifer Nettles '97, lead singer of the AMA and Grammy award-winning country music band Sugarland
Marsha Norman '69, playwright
 Frances Freeborn Pauley '27, civil rights activist
Agnes White Sanford 1919, author of The Healing Light
Saycon Sengbloh '00, actress and singer
Martha Priscilla Shaw, mayor of Sumter, South Carolina (1952–1956), first female mayor in South Carolina
 Willie W. Smith, physiologist and NIH researcher
 Cornelia Strong, 1901 (Agnes Scott Institute), professor, mathematician, and astronomer
 Edna Lowe Swift '71, first black student to graduate from Agnes Scott, activist
 Jean H. Toal '65, Chief Justice of the South Carolina Supreme Court
 Leila Ross Wilburn 1904, architect
Anna Irwin Young 1910 (Agnes Scott Institute, d.), professor of mathematics, physics and astronomy

References

Further reading
Earnshaw, Rebecca Lee. Students at Agnes Scott College During the 1930s. Decatur, GA: Agnes Scott College, 1988.
McNair, Walter Edward. Lest We Forget: An Account of Agnes Scott College. Decatur, GA: Agnes Scott College, 1983.
Noble, Betty Pope Scott. The Story of George Washington Scott, 1829–1903: A Family Memoir. Decatur, GA: Agnes Scott College, 2002.
Pope, Loren. "Agnes Scott College." In Colleges That Change Lives. New York: Penguin, 2000.
Sayrs, M. Lee. A Full and Rich Measure: 100 Years of Educating Women at Agnes Scott College, 1889–1989. Atlanta, GA: Susan Hunter, Inc., 1990.

External links

 Official website
 National Register of Historic Places: South Candler Street—Agnes Scott College Historic District

 
1889 establishments in Georgia (U.S. state)
Decatur, Georgia
Educational institutions established in 1889
Historic districts on the National Register of Historic Places in Georgia (U.S. state)
Liberal arts colleges in Georgia (U.S. state)
National Register of Historic Places in DeKalb County, Georgia
Universities and colleges accredited by the Southern Association of Colleges and Schools
Universities and colleges affiliated with the Presbyterian Church (USA)
Universities and colleges in DeKalb County, Georgia
Women's universities and colleges in the United States
Private universities and colleges in Georgia (U.S. state)